

192001–192100 

|-
| 192001 Raynatedford ||  || Rayna M. Tedford (born 1960), scientist with the Southwest Research Institute, who worked for the New Horizons mission to Pluto as the Pluto Encounter Deputy Logistics Lead || 
|}

192101–192200 

|-id=155
| 192155 Hargittai ||  || Magdolna Hargittai and István Hargittai, Hungarian chemists and members of the Hungarian Academy of Sciences, whose research is structural chemistry. In 2011, they received the annual science communication award of the Club of Hungarian Science Journalists. || 
|-id=158
| 192158 Christian ||  || Christian Apitzsch (born 1968), son of German amateur astronomer Rolf Apitzsch who discovered this minor planet || 
|-id=178
| 192178 Lijieshou ||  || Li Jieshou (born 1924), an academician of Chinese Engineering Academy, is the founder of surgical nutriology and therapies of refractory gastrointestinal disease in China. || 
|}

192201–192300 

|-id=208
| 192208 Tzu Chi ||  || The Buddhist Compassion Relief Tzu Chi Foundation, established in Taiwan in 1966, has grown to be an international humanitarian organization with over 10 million members in 47 countries || 
|-id=220
| 192220 Oicles ||  || Oicles (Oecles), from Greek mythology. He was an Argive king, father of Amphiaraus and son of Mantius. || 
|-id=291
| 192291 Palindrome ||  || A palindrome is a word, number, phrase, or other sequence of characters which reads the same backward as forward, of which the permanent number of this minor planet is an example. || 
|-id=293
| 192293 Dominikbrunner ||  || Dominik Brunner (1959–2009), Bavarian entrepreneur, killed in a fight which resulted from Brunner trying to protect a group of school children from attacks by teenagers || 
|}

192301–192400 

|-bgcolor=#f2f2f2
| colspan=4 align=center | 
|}

192401–192500 

|-id=439
| 192439 Cílek || 1997 VC || Václav Cílek (born 1955), Czech geologist, climatologist, writer, philosopher and science popularizer || 
|-id=450
| 192450 Xinjiangdaxue ||  || The Xinjiang University (Xinjiangdaxue) was founded in 1924 and is one of the national key comprehensive universities. It is listed as a comprehensive university for further development in the Great West Project of China. || 
|}

192501–192600 

|-bgcolor=#f2f2f2
| colspan=4 align=center | 
|}

192601–192700 

|-id=686
| 192686 Aljuroma ||  || Alexandra, Juri, Robin and Marlene, grandchildren of German amateur astronomer Norbert Ehring who discovered this Mars-crossing asteroid || 
|}

192701–192800 

|-bgcolor=#f2f2f2
| colspan=4 align=center | 
|}

192801–192900 

|-bgcolor=#f2f2f2
| colspan=4 align=center | 
|}

192901–193000 

|-bgcolor=#f2f2f2
| colspan=4 align=center | 
|}

References 

192001-193000